Schrag is a surname. Notable people with the surname include:

Anthony Schrag (born 1975), Scottish artist and academic
Ariel Schrag (born 1979), American cartoonist and television writer
Daniel P. Schrag (born 1966), American geologist and professor
Karl Schrag (1912–2000), American printmaker and educator